Yaginuma (written: 柳沼 or 八木沼) is a Japanese surname. Notable people with the surname include:

, Japanese professional wrestler
, Japanese figure skater
, Japanese model
, Japanese manga artist

Japanese-language surnames